The third season of the Sailor Moon anime series, Sailor Moon S (originally released in Japan as , and later as Pretty Guardian Sailor Moon S), was produced by Toei Animation and directed by Kunihiko Ikuhara. It began broadcasting on TV Asahi on March 19, 1994, and ended on February 25, 1995. It adapts the "Infinity" arc of the Sailor Moon manga series by Naoko Takeuchi, and follows the adventures of Usagi Tsukino and her fellow Sailor Guardians. In this season, they must fight against the Death Busters, who are planning to take over Earth. In 2000, Cloverway Inc. licensed the season for an English-language broadcast in North America. Optimum Productions dubbed the season, continuing over from the first two seasons that were licensed by DIC Entertainment and General Mills' The Program Exchange. The series aired on YTV in Canada, who adjusted the episode numbers to match those of the original Japanese version, from June 12, 2000 to August 1, 2000. The season later aired on Cartoon Network's Toonami programming block in the United States. Edited and unedited VHS tapes and uncut bilingual DVDs of their adaptation were released by Pioneer Entertainment. In contrast to DIC's handling of the first two seasons, Cloverway retained the background music and sound effects from the original Japanese version. Eventually, the season was re-licensed by Viz Media in 2014 for an updated English-language release, produced by Studiopolis. The first 18 episodes of the season were released as Part 1 on November 15, 2016, and the remaining 18 episodes were released as Part 2 on June 20, 2017. While Sailor Moon S began very similarly to the first two seasons, it eventually took a darker, more emotional turn.

One of the controversies surrounding Sailor Moon S is in the romantic-lesbian relationship of Sailor Uranus and Sailor Neptune, who are subtly depicted as romantic lovers, although this is never mentioned directly. Takeuchi has openly admitted they are a romantic couple, and their voice actresses were instructed to play the characters "as if they are a married romantic couple." However, because of differing cultural standards, most countries outside Japan, excluding Greece, Germany, Spain, and Mexico, have censored the relationship. In the Cloverway/Optimum English version, this subtext was altered, and Neptune and Uranus were portrayed as biological cousins instead of being in a romantic relationship with each other. The Viz/Studiopolis English version preserves the subtext of the original material.

In the 1995 favorite episode polls for Animage, "Death of Uranus and Neptune!? Talismans Appear" came in first place, "The Bond of Destiny! The Distant Days of Uranus" came in eighth place, and "The Labyrinth of Water! Ami the Targeted" came in ninth place. The following year, "A Bright Shooting Star! Saturn, and the Messiah" came in fifteenth place.

Three pieces of theme music used: one opening theme and two ending themes. The opening theme, an updated version of "Moonlight Densetsu" is performed by Moon Lips. The first ending theme, used for the first two episodes, is "Otome no Policy" performed by Yoko Ishida. The second ending theme, used for the remainder of the season, is "Tuxedo Mirage" performed by Peach Hips, a group consisting of voice actresses Kotono Mitsuishi, Michie Tomizawa, Aya Hisakawa, Emi Shinohara and Rika Fukami. Cloverway used the English-language version of "Moonlight Densetsu" first commissioned for DiC Entertainment's dub of the first season and R for their adaptation.

Episode list (1994–1995)

Home video releases

Japanese

DVD

Blu-ray

English

VHS

United States

DVD

United States

Australia and New Zealand

Blu-ray

United States

Australia and New Zealand

Film

The film is adapted from a side story of the original manga series created by Naoko Takeuchi, The Lover of Princess Kaguya. The film was released on December 4, 1994 in Japan as part of the Winter '94 Toei Anime Fair.

Video games

Several video games were released to promote this season, most of them developed or published by Bandai. In 1994, the puzzle video game Bishoujo Senshi Sailor Moon S: Kondo wa Puzzle de Oshiokiyo! was developed by Tom Create and published by Bandai for Super Nintendo Entertainment System. A fighting game named Bishoujo Senshi Sailor Moon S: Jōgai Rantō!? Shuyaku Sōdatsusen was developed by Arc System Works and published by Angel (a subsidiary company of Bandai) also in 1994 for Super NES. In 1995, another puzzle game called Bishoujo Senshi Sailor Moon S Kurukkurin was developed by Tom Create for Super NES. In the same year, Shimada Kikaku developed a fighting game for Game Gear called Bishoujo Senshi Sailor Moon S. In 1994, trivia game Bishoujo Senshi Sailor Moon S: Quiz Taiketsu! Sailor Power Ketsushuu was developed and published for Playdia. Also developed and published in 1994 was another trivia game called Bishoujo Senshi Sailor Moon S: Kotaete Moon Call!, for Terebikko. The following year, Tose developed Pretty Soldier Sailor Moon S, a fighting game for 3DO Interactive Multiplayer.

References

External links

1994 Japanese television seasons
1995 Japanese television seasons
1990s LGBT-related television series
Cross-dressing in anime and manga
Sailor Moon seasons